Moonshine is an unincorporated community located in Clark County, Illinois, United States. It has been featured on the CBS Sunday Morning Show. There is only one building in the entire town (not including the outhouse), and this was a grocery store built in 1912. It was later sold to Helen and Roy Tuttle in 1982, who created a restaurant that serves their famous Moonburger. One feature is that the store/restaurant has a guest-book with visitors from all 50 states and around the world. During the 2017 Terry Hammond Memorial Moonshine Lunchrun, a new record of 3362 sandwiches were served. The store is open from 6 AM until 1 PM Monday through Saturday, with the grill closing at 12:30.

Geography
The location of Moonshine is published on United States Geological Survey topographical maps as well as the Geographic Names Information System (GNIS). It is GNIS feature ID 422996 and is listed as a populated place.

According to the Houston Chronicle, as of 1987, Moonshine was a dry town. The article also offered two alternative theories on the origin of town's name. One version attributes its name to the "moon shining on swampy land near the store." While another version attributed to a long time local resident states that a family from Philadelphia named it in the 1850s to honor locations in Pennsylvania.

Demographics
Moonshine is not a census-designated place, but is locally described as "a wide spot in the road" with a population of 2. As of 2015, Moonshine has only one resident, a widow.

References

Further reading
 "Business is good at store in two-person, rural town"; Tara Burghardt. Associated Press. The State Journal-Register. Springfield, Ill. December 7, 1997. pg. 18
 "Hotline -- Learn how to find the governor, WWII medals and Moonshine"; Brenda Story. Journal Star. Peoria, Ill.: Jan 16, 2004. pg. B.6
 "Moonshine, a run-down relic, serves burgers, nostalgia, pickle relish." Ted Gregory. Knight Ridder Tribune News Service. Washington: June 27, 2005. pg. 1
 "Moonshine, Illinois." John Dappert. Agriculture Online. August 18, 2004.
 "They serve an intoxicating burger in Moonshine." Phil Jacobs. Herald & Review (Decatur, IL). C1. June 3, 2003.
 "Searching for the elusive 'Moonburger'." John Trump. The Fayetteville Observer. October 22, 2004.

External links
 Moonshine History at Genealogy Trails.

Unincorporated communities in Clark County, Illinois
Unincorporated communities in Illinois
Populated places established in 1912
1912 establishments in Illinois